Gavrielle Holmes, also known as Gavrielle Gemma, is an American communist politician. She was a third-party candidate (Workers World Party) for President of the United States in the U.S. presidential election, 1984, receiving votes in Ohio (2,565) and Rhode Island.  For other states, the presidential candidate that year was Larry Holmes.

She had also been the running mate for Deirdre Griswold in the 1980 U.S. presidential election in some states.

She is currently living in New Orleans, Louisiana and is a member of the New Orleans Workers Group. She is an organizer of Takem Down Nola, a group of civil rights activists that successfully fought to remove 5 Confederate statues from the city.

References

Year of birth missing (living people)
Living people
Female candidates for President of the United States
Candidates in the 1984 United States presidential election
20th-century American politicians
1980 United States vice-presidential candidates
Workers World Party presidential nominees
Female candidates for Vice President of the United States
Workers World Party vice presidential nominees
20th-century American women politicians
21st-century American women